Paxton is a town in Walton County, Florida, United States. The population was 644 as of the 2010 census. Located near Britton Hill on the Alabama–Florida state line, the town has the highest elevation of any in Florida.

Geography

Paxton is on the state line with Alabama, being bordered by the town of Florala on the north.

At an elevation of 318 feet (97 m), Paxton is the highest incorporated settlement in Florida.

Demographics

At the 2000 census there were 656 people, 263 households, and 185 families in the town. The racial makeup of the town was 94.05% White, 1.68% African American, 2.90% Native American, 0.15% from other races, and 1.22% from two or more races. Hispanic or Latino of any race were 1.68%.

Of the 263 households 28.5% had children under the age of 18 living with them, 51.7% were married couples living together, 13.7% had a female householder with no husband present, and 29.3% were non-families. 27.0% of households were one person and 12.9% were one person aged 65 or older. The average household size was 2.49 and the average family size was 2.96.

The age distribution was 25.5% under the age of 18, 6.7% from 18 to 24, 25.2% from 25 to 44, 26.7% from 45 to 64, and 16.0% 65 or older. The median age was 39 years. For every 100 females, there were 88.0 males. For every 100 females age 18 and over, there were 82.5 males.

The median income for a household in the town was $24,625, and the median family income  was $35,000. Males had a median income of $25,781 versus $21,375 for females. The per capita income for the town was $14,108. About 7.1% of families and 12.3% of the population were below the poverty line, including 15.6% of those under age 18 and 12.1% of those age 65 or over.

References

Towns in Walton County, Florida
Towns in Florida